French football club SC Bastia's 2007–08 season. Finished 11th place in league. Top scorer of the season, including 13 goals in 12 league matches have been Xavier Pentecôte. Was eliminated to Coupe de France end of 16, the Coupe de la Ligue was able to be among the 1. tour.

Transfers

In 
Summer
 Xavier Pentecôte from Toulouse
 Féthi Harek from Rodez
 Fabrice Jau from Sedan
 Alexandre Licata from AS Monaco
 Kafoumba Coulibaly from Tero Sasana
 Jean-Christophe Cesto from Marseille Consolat
 Hassoun Camara from Marseille

Winter
 No.

Out 
Summer
 Franco Dolci to Talleres
 Abdelmalek Cherrad to free
 Frédéric Née to retired
 Florent Laville to retired
 Eric Marester to Troyes
 Foued Kalaoui to Gazélec Ajaccio
 Patrice Sorbara to CA Bastia
 Abouderaa Anthony to AS Monaco
 Gilles Cioni to Paris FC

Winter
 Mehdi Méniri to Al-Khor

Squad

Ligue 2

League table

Results summary

Results by round

Matches

Coupe de France

Coupe de la Ligue

Statistics

Top scorers

League top assists

References 

SC Bastia seasons
Bastia